Paul Wesley Householder (born September 4, 1958) is a retired American professional baseball outfielder. He played during eight seasons at the major league level with the Cincinnati Reds, St. Louis Cardinals, Milwaukee Brewers, and Houston Astros of Major League Baseball(MLB).

Early years
Householder was born on September 4, 1958 in Columbus, Ohio.

Playing career

Minor leagues
He was drafted by the Reds in the 2nd round of the 1976 amateur draft from North Haven High School.

Major leagues

Cincinnati Reds
Householder made  his MLB debut with the Reds  on August 26, 1980, playing 20 games, producing a batting average of .244. He again saw limited action in the strike-shortened season of 1981, though improved his batting average to .275. Householder started 100 games for the Reds in 1982, but batted only .211, producing a negative  WAR.  1983 was Householder's best season with the Reds, starting 95 games with a batting average of .255. In 1984, he was traded to the St Louis Cardinals for John Stuper.

St Louis Cardinals
After appearing in just 13 games with the Cardinals, Householder was traded with Jim Adduci to the Milwaukee Brewers in exchange for Rich Buonantony, Jim Koontz and Ron Koenigsfield.

Milwaukee Brewers
Householder played two seasons with the Brewers before being granted free agent status after the 1986  season.

Houston Astros
Householder saw limited action with the Astros in 1987, and was granted free agency at the end of the season.

References

External links

1958 births
Living people
American expatriate baseball players in Canada
Baseball players from Columbus, Ohio
Billings Mustangs players
Cincinnati Reds players
Houston Astros players
Indianapolis Indians players
Major League Baseball outfielders
Milwaukee Brewers players
Nashville Sounds players
Shelby Reds players
St. Louis Cardinals players
Tampa Tarpons (1957–1987) players
Tucson Toros players
Vancouver Canadians players
Wichita Aeros players